Dragojevići is a village in the municipality of Foča, Republika Srpska, Bosnia and Herzegovina.

References

Villages in Republika Srpska
Populated places in Foča